The mountain pass theorem is an existence theorem from the calculus of variations, originally due to Antonio Ambrosetti and Paul Rabinowitz.  Given certain conditions on a function, the theorem demonstrates the existence of a saddle point.  The theorem is unusual in that there are many other theorems regarding the existence of extrema, but few regarding saddle points.

Statement 
The assumptions of the theorem are:
  is a functional from a Hilbert space H to the reals,
  satisfies the Palais–Smale compactness condition,
 ,
 there exist positive constants r and a such that  if , and
 there exists  with  such that .
If we define:

and:

then the conclusion of the theorem is that c is a critical value of I.

Visualization 

The intuition behind the theorem is in the name "mountain pass."  Consider I as describing elevation.  Then we know two low spots in the landscape: the origin because , and a far-off spot v where .  In between the two lies a range of mountains (at ) where the elevation is high (higher than a>0).  In order to travel along a path g from the origin to v, we must pass over the mountains—that is, we must go up and then down.  Since I is somewhat smooth, there must be a critical point somewhere in between.  (Think along the lines of the mean-value theorem.)  The mountain pass lies along the path that passes at the lowest elevation through the mountains.  Note that this mountain pass is almost always a saddle point.

For a proof, see section 8.5 of Evans.

Weaker formulation 
Let  be Banach space. The assumptions of the theorem are:
 There exists  such that one can find certain  with
.

In this case there is a critical point  of  satisfying . Moreover, if we define

then

For a proof, see section 5.5 of Aubin and Ekeland.

References

Further reading 
 
 
 
 
 
 

Mathematical analysis
Calculus of variations
Theorems in analysis